Birkengrund is a railway station in the town of Ludwigsfelde, Brandenburg, Germany. The station lies on the Anhalt Railway and the train services are operated by Deutsche Bahn.

Train services
The station is served by the following service(s):

Regional services  Rathenow - Berlin - Ludwigsfelde - Jüterbog

References

Railway stations in Brandenburg
Buildings and structures in Teltow-Fläming
Railway stations in Germany opened in 1938